Sydney George Nelson (December 9, 1932 – July 10, 2021) was an American politician in the state of Minnesota. He served in the Minnesota House of Representatives from 1991 to 1992 and from 1993 to 1994. He was previously a Wadena County, Minnesota county commissioner, serving from 1986 to 1991.

References

1932 births
2021 deaths
People from New York Mills, Minnesota
Minnesota State University Moorhead alumni
St. Cloud State University alumni
County commissioners in Minnesota
Democratic Party members of the Minnesota House of Representatives
Farmers from Minnesota